The Lt. Benjamin Locke Store is a historic building in Arlington, Massachusetts.  It currently functions as a four-family private residence.  The -story wood-frame structure was built in 1816 by Lieutenant Benjamin Locke, son of Revolutionary War veteran Captain Benjamin Locke.  He established it as a shop to take advantage of the recently established Middlesex Turnpike, which ran past its door.  It was converted into a four-family residence in 1854, a role it continues to serve.  In 1912, the house was designated as a "pest house" during a smallpox outbreak, but its use was not required.

The building was listed on the National Register of Historic Places in 1985.

See also
National Register of Historic Places listings in Arlington, Massachusetts

References

Commercial buildings on the National Register of Historic Places in Massachusetts
Houses in Arlington, Massachusetts
National Register of Historic Places in Arlington, Massachusetts